"Traveling" (stylized as "traveling") is a song recorded by Japanese–American recording artist Hikaru Utada. It was released as the second single from her fourth studio and third Japanese language album, Deep River (2002). The track was written and composed by Utada, whilst production was handled by Utada, her father Teruzane Utada, and long-time collaborator Akira Miyake. Musically, "Traveling" is a dance-pop song, influenced by house music. Lyrically, it discusses human activities and dreams.

The song received positive reviews from most music critics. Many selected it as one of Utada's best singles, and was complimented for its production and dance-oriented composition. It was also successful in Japan, peaking at number one the Oricon Singles Chart. It was certified in two categories by the Recording Industry Association of Japan (RIAJ), and was the second best selling single of the year 2002. A music video was filmed for "Traveling" in 2001, featuring Utada as a hostess travelling on a spacecraft with passengers. It has been performed on some of Utada's tours, including Utada in Bokuhan (2004), Utada United (2006) and Laughter in the Dark (2018).

Background and release
"Traveling" was written and composed by Utada, whilst production was handled by Utada, her father Teruzane Utada, and long-time collaborator Akira Miyake. This was Utada's first original single to have been handled by Utada, her father, and Miyake since her single releases from her debut album First Love (1999); she had primarily worked with American producers, such as Rodney Jerkins, Jimmy Jam & Terry Lewis for her second studio album Distance (2001). The song included live instrumentation by Saito Mitsutaka, who played the bass guitar, and Tsunemi Kazuhide, who played synthesizers, while it was arranged by Utada and Kawano Kei. The song was recorded and mixed by Ugajin Masaaki and Matsui Atushi in 2001 at Bunkamura Studio, Shibuya, Tokyo. It was released as the second single from her fourth studio and third Japanese language album, Deep River (2002). Since then, the song has been remastered and re-released twice; the first on April 1, 2004, and the second time on December 9, 2014 for Utada's first greatest hits album Utada Hikaru Single Collection Vol. 1 (2003).

It was released as a CD single, in both Japan and China. Both formats included the original track, two remixes by PlanitB and Bahiatronic, plus the instrumental version. The artwork for the CD single's were photographed by Utada's husband at the time, Kazuaki Kiriya. It has a close-up shot of Utada in front of a multi-colored background. A promotional 12" vinyl was released by Toshiba-EMI in December 2001, and included both the remixed tracks. Then on January 30, 2002, Toshiba-EMI released "Traveling" as a DVD single, which included the "behind the scenes" video and the music video. The vinyls artwork was a screenshot taken by Kiriya.

Composition
Musically, "Traveling" is a dance-pop song, influenced by house music. Kano, editor in chief for Rockin'On Japan magazine noted elements of house music in the song's composition. An editor for Amazon labelled the track a "party tune". CD Journal staff member's wrote that the song had a "speedy dance beat". Lyrically, it discusses human activities and dreams. Kano felt that although the song themes are about dreams and nightmares, he believed it should "be taken seriously" as he felt it intertwined with reality. The reviewer from Amazon stated that "Traveling" was proof that Utada was one of the most successful singer-songwriters in Japanese music.

Critical response
"Traveling" received very positive reviews from music critics. AllMusic's David Jeffries selected the song as one of Utada's best singles. Fellow Japanese recording artist Kyary Pamyu Pamyu contributed to The Guardians music playlist columns, and highlighted "Traveling" as one of Utada's best songs; she further stated in a detailed review: "People living outside Japan will also enjoy her creativity. It’s pop and yet a little bit dark and scary. I like the chemistry." A reviewer from Amazon praised the track, calling it "perfect". In another positive review, a critic from CD Journal complimented the dance composition, but felt the lyrical content was the best feature of the track.

Accolades
At the 16th Japan Gold Disc Awards, Utada won the Song of the Year award for "Traveling"; she had also won another similar award that year for her single "Can You Keep a Secret?". Similarly, she also received the Silver Award recognition at the 2003 Japanese Society for Rights of Authors, Composers and Publishers Awards (JASRAC). In December 2015, in honor of Utada's comeback into the music business, Japanese website Goo.ne.jp hosted a poll for fans to rank their favourite songs by Utada out of 25 positions; the poll was held in only twenty-four hours, and thousands submitted their votes. As a result, "Traveling" was ranked at number seven with 71 votes in total.

Commercial performance
Commercially, "Traveling" was a success in Japan. It became her sixth single to debut at number one on the Oricon Singles Chart, with over 277,100 units sold in its first week. It stayed at number one for a sole week, and spent a total of 20 weeks on that chart. By the end of 2002, the single was ranked at number two on Oricon's Annual 2002 chart, just behind Ayumi Hamasaki's extended play H; it sold 856,140 units by the end of the year. This made it the second highest selling single by a female artist, just behind Hamasaki's entry, but was the highest selling single that did not include any other B-side or A-side tracks. The single was certified million by the Recording Industry Association of Japan (RIAJ) for physical shipments of one million units.

Eight years after its initial release, "Traveling" entered the Billboard Adult Alternative Radio Songs chart at number 81 during the chart week of April 6. It re-entered the chart during the chart week of May 6, 2015, peaking at number 75. It was certified gold by RIAJ for cellphone downloads of 100,000 units. According to the Oricon Style database, it is Utada's sixth-highest selling single.

The DVD single was a success on the Oricon DVD Chart, peaking at number one. The Oricon Style database ranks the DVD single as Utada's second best selling DVD, just behind the live release of her Bohemian Summer 2000 Concert tour. As of May 2016, it is the 51st best selling DVD in Japan, selling over 820,000 units.

Music video
An accompanying music video was directed by Kazuaki Kiriya. It opens with the camera traveling through a tunnel full of lights, and includes the song's title and Utada's name. For the first part of the song, it has Utada singing into a microphone, whilst walking inside the head of a spacecraft. The spacecraft exits the station, and flies all over a futuristic cityscape. The first verse has Utada as a hostess on the spacecraft, helping and serving the passengers in a dancing manner; the passengers are wearing theatrical clothing and headpieces that cover their faces. During the pre-chorus, Utada sings in front of a forest-like backdrop, whilst a stop-motion animation of her is walking through the woods, observing disfigured creatures. The chorus has Utada and the passengers marching across a bridge, while continuous intercut scenes of Utada outside a party is seen.

During the second verse, it has the spacecraft traveling past the moon, whilst Utada cleans up the mess the passengers left on their tables. By the second pre-chorus, several passengers play ping pong, as Utada exercises. The second chorus has Utada dancing inside a party, whilst intercut scenes of different stop motion animations are seen. In the bridge section, it has a close-up of Utada in front of a forest-like backdrop again, and also has Utada sitting on a swing. The final chorus has the spacecraft falling onto the ground, and creates a vast field of flowers, trees, and grass. The final scene has the camera zooming out of the spacecraft next to a tree, riddled with vines and flowers. The music video and the behind the scenes video was included on her DVD compilation Single Clip Collection Vol. 3 (2000).

The video achieved success by critics and several award ceremonies. Japanese recording artist Kyary Pamyu Pamyu wrote for The Guardian, and said that the video "is a strong interpretation of the music." She also praised the video's creativity. At the 17th Japan Gold Disc Awards, "Traveling" won the Music Video of the Year trophy.

Live performances and promotion
The single has been performed on majority of Utada's concert tours. Its first performance was in 2004, during her Bokuhan concert tour. It appeared on the live DVD, which was released on July 28, 2004. It was included on Utada's debut English concert tour named Utada United, which was later included on the live DVD, released on December 20, 2006. The song was performed during Utada's two date concert series Wild Life in December 2010. Since the track's release, it has appeared on three compilation releases: Utada Hikaru Single Collection Vol. 1 (2003), its 2014 remastered version, and a special bundle of the compilation and the vol. 2 collection on a USB.

Track listings and formatsCD single"Traveling" – 5:17
"Traveling" (PlanitB Remix) – 10:35
"Traveling" (Bahiatronic Remix) – 6:42
"Traveling" (Instrumental) – 5:1712-inch vinyl"Traveling" (PlanitB Remix) – 10:35
"Traveling" (Bahiatronic Remix) – 6:42DVD single"Traveling" (Behind the scenes video)
"Traveling" (Music video)Japanese digital EP'
"Traveling" – 5:17
"Traveling" (PlanitB Remix) – 10:35
"Traveling" (Bahiatronic Remix) – 6:42
"Traveling" (Instrumental) – 5:17

Charts

Daily, weekly, and monthly charts

Year-end charts

All-time chart

DVD charts

Charts

All-time chart

Certifications

Release history

Notes

References

External links
"Traveling" – Hikaru Utada's official website (in Japanese).

2001 singles
2001 songs
EMI Music Japan singles
Hikaru Utada songs
Oricon Weekly number-one singles
Songs used as jingles
Songs written by Hikaru Utada